The Asian Tour 2014/2015 – Event 1 (also known as the 2014 Yixing Open) was a professional minor-rankingsnooker tournament that took place between 17 and 21 June 2014 at the Yixing Sports Centre in Yixing, China.

Joe Perry was the defending champion, but he lost 1–4 against Ding Junhui in the last 16.

Ding won his 17th professional title by defeating Michael Holt 4–2 in the final.

Prize fund
The breakdown of prize money of the event is shown below:

Main draw

Preliminary round
Best of 7 frames

Main rounds

Top half

Section 1

Section 2

Section 3

Section 4

Bottom half

Section 5

Section 6

Section 7

Section 8

Finals

Century breaks

 136, 103, 101, 100  Li Hang
 135, 128, 124, 120, 119  Ding Junhui
 135  Michael Holt
 129  Ryan Day
 127  Barry Pinches
 125, 105  Craig Steadman
 124, 102  Robert Milkins
 120  Chen Feilong

 117  Graeme Dott
 112  Yu Delu
 110, 103, 101  Jamie Burnett
 110  Qian Hua
 108  Sean O'Sullivan
 104  Matthew Selt
 104  Lu Ning
 104  Stuart Bingham

References

External links
 2014 Yixing Open – Pictures by Tai Chengzhe at Facebook

2014
AT1
2014 in Chinese sport
Asian Tour Event 1